Michael Caro (born 8 May 1985) is a Puerto Rican international soccer player who plays as a striker.

Career
Caro plays college soccer for Christopher Newport University, and made two international appearances for Puerto Rico in 2008.

References

1985 births
Living people
Puerto Rican footballers
Puerto Rico international footballers
Christopher Newport University alumni
Northern Virginia Royals players
USL League Two players
Association football forwards